The First cabinet of Jóhanna Sigurðardóttir in Iceland was formed 1 February 2009 after the Second cabinet of Geir Haarde resigned due to the 2009 Icelandic financial crisis protests.

Cabinet

Inaugural cabinet: 1 February 2009 – 10 May 2009

See also
Government of Iceland
Cabinet of Iceland

References

Johanna Sigurdardottir, First cabinet of
Johanna Sigurdardottir, First cabinet of
Johanna Sigurdardottir, First cabinet of
Cabinets established in 2009
Cabinets disestablished in 2009
Social Democratic Alliance